Rune Carlsson (1 October 1909 – 14 September 1943) was a Swedish football midfielder who played for Sweden in the 1934 FIFA World Cup. He also played for IFK Eskilstuna.

References

External links

1909 births
1943 deaths
Swedish footballers
Sweden international footballers
Association football midfielders
IFK Eskilstuna players
1934 FIFA World Cup players